Juan de Dios Mataflorida Pueblos (8 March 1943 – 21 October 2017) was a Roman Catholic bishop.

Pueblos was born on 8 March 1943 in Moto Sur in the municipality of Loon, Bohol. He studied at the Immaculate Heart Seminary in Tagbilaran and San Carlos Major Seminary.

Pueblos was ordained to the priesthood on 30 March 1968 and was consecrated as bishop on 24 June 1985. He was appointed auxiliary bishop of the Archdiocese of Davao by Pope John Paul II on 29 April 1985. He served in the post until 3 February 1987 while also simultaneously being the Titular bishop of Zaba in Algeria. He served as bishop of the Diocese of Kidapawan from 3 February 1987 to 27 November 1995. Pueblos served as bishop of the Diocese of Butuan from 27 November 1995 until his death in 21 October 2017. He was confined at the Cardinal Santos Medical Center in San Juan, Metro Manila for almost two months due to leukemia before his death.

See also
Catholic Church in the Philippines

Notes

1943 births
2017 deaths
21st-century Roman Catholic bishops in the Philippines
People from San Juan, Metro Manila
20th-century Roman Catholic bishops in the Philippines